Euronext N.V. (short for European New Exchange Technology) is a pan-European bourse that offers various trading and post-trade services.

Traded assets include regulated equities, exchange-traded funds (ETF), warrants and certificates, bonds, derivatives, commodities, foreign exchange as well as indices. In December 2021, it had nearly 2,000 listed issuers worth €6.9 trillion in market capitalisation. Euronext is the largest center for debt and funds listings in the world, and provides technology and managed services to third parties. In addition to its main regulated market, it operates Euronext Growth and Euronext Access, providing access to listing for small and medium-sized enterprises. Euronext's commodity market includes the electric power exchange Nord Pool, as well as Fish Pool.

Post-trade services include clearing performed by Euronext's multi-asset clearing house, Euronext Clearing, as well as custody and settlement performed by Euronext's central securities depository (CSD), Euronext Securities.

Euronext's registered office and corporate headquarters are situated in Amsterdam and Paris, respectively.

Euronext traces its origins back to the world's first bourses, formed in the Low Countries' shifting trade centres, Bruge, Antwerp and Amsterdam in 1285, 1485 and 1602, respectively, as well as to the foundation of the Paris Bourse in 1724. In its present form, Euronext was founded by the merger of European Union (EU) stock exchanges at the turn of the 21st century, following the introduction of the single currency and harmonisation of financial markets.

The present day Euronext was spun off from the Intercontinental Exchange (ICE) in 2014, shortly after ICE's acquisition of NYSE Euronext the year before.

Operations

Trading services

Equity

Euronext operates its main regulated market, as well two types of multilateral trading facilities (MTFs) providing access to listing for small and medium-sized enterprises (SMEs), titled Euronext Growth and Euronext Access.

Euronext maintains a single order book at its proprietary market plattform Optiq.
 

Euronext manages various country (national), as well as pan-European regional and sector and strategy indices.

Foreign exchange
Euronext FX is a global foreign exchange trading platform, known as FastMatch until 2019.

Commodities
Euronext offers trading in a number of commodities, including:
 Electric power: Nord Pool
 Salmon futures: Fish Pool
 Milling wheat
 Rapeseed
 Corn
 Durum wheat
 Wood pellets

Derivatives
Euronext operates derivatives markets.

Debt and funds listings
Euronext is the largest centre for debt and funds listings in the world.

Exchange-traded funds
Euronext's product range also includes exchange-traded funds.

Warrants and certificates

Bonds

Post-trade services

Central securities depository

Euronext provides custody and settlement services through its central securities depository (CSD), Euronext Securities, based on Euronext's ownership of previous national CSDs in Denmark, Italy, Norway and Portugal.

Clearing

Between 2016 and 2019 Euronext owned a 20% share in European Central Counterparty N.V. (EuroCCP).

As of December 2019, Euronext owns an 11.1% share in LCH SA.

As part of its acquisition of the Italian Bourse in 2021, Euronext obtained the multi-asset clearing house Cassa di Compensazione e Garanzia S.p.A. (CC&G). CC&G was renamed Euronext Clearing.

Euronext Corporate Services (ECS)

Euronext Corporate Services (ECS) is a wholly-owned subsidiary of Euronext. Founded in 2016, ECS provides solutions and services to more than 4,000 organisations, ranging from corporates to the public sector.

It has acquired a number of companies, including Company Webcast (webcasting), iBabs (board portal), InsiderLog (compliance software), and launched new solutions, such as IntegrityLog (whistleblowing), and IR.manager (Investor relation management).

Financial information

History

Background: Exchange companies that merged into Euronext

2000–2007: Founding merger and early acquisitions

In 1998, the London Stock Exchange and Deutsche Börse announced their intention of forming an alliance to fend off competition from the United States, and take advantage from the European Union's (EU) single currency and harmonisation of financial markets. In April 1999 the stock exchanges in Paris, Zurich, Madrid, Brussels, Amsterdam, and Milan signed a memorandum of understanding in Madrid, which formalised plans to include these bourses as well.

Ultimately, only three decided to proceed, and on 22 September 2000 Euronext was formed following a merger of the Amsterdam Stock Exchange,  Brussels Stock Exchange, and Paris Bourse.

In December 2001, Euronext acquired the shares of the London International Financial Futures and Options Exchange (LIFFE), forming Euronext.LIFFE. In 2002 the group merged with the Portuguese stock exchange Bolsa de Valores de Lisboa e Porto (BVLP), renamed Euronext Lisbon. In 2001, Euronext became a listed company itself after completing its initial public offering.

In 2003, Euronext cash products were integrated onto a single platform (NSC).

In 2004, Euronext derivatives products were integrated onto LIFFE CONNECT.

In 2005, Euronext introduced Alternext as a market segment to help finance small and mid-class companies in the Eurozone.

2007–2014: Merger with the New York Stock Exchange and acquisition by Intercontinental Exchange

Due to apparent moves by NASDAQ to acquire the London Stock Exchange or Euronext itself, NYSE Group, owner of the New York Stock Exchange (NYSE), offered €8 billion (US$10.2b) in cash and shares for Euronext on 22 May 2006, outbidding a rival offer for the European Stock exchange operator from Deutsche Börse, the German stock market. Contrary to statements that it would not raise its bid, on 23 May 2006, Deutsche Börse unveiled a merger bid for Euronext, valuing the pan-European exchange at €8.6 billion (US$11b), €600 million over NYSE Group's initial bid. Despite this, NYSE Group and Euronext penned a merger agreement, subject to shareholder vote and regulatory approval. The initial regulatory response by SEC chief Christopher Cox (who was coordinating heavily with European counterparts) was positive, with an expected approval by the end of 2007.

Deutsche Börse dropped out of the bidding for Euronext on 15 November 2006, removing the last major hurdle for the NYSE Euronext transaction. A run-up of NYSE Group's stock price in late 2006 made the offering far more attractive to Euronext's shareholders.
On 19 December 2006, Euronext shareholders approved the transaction with 98.2% of the vote. Only 1.8% voted in favour of the Deutsche Börse offer. Jean-François Théodore, the chief executive officer of Euronext, stated that they expected the transaction to close within three or four months.
Some of the regulatory agencies with jurisdiction over the merger had already given approval. NYSE Group shareholders gave their approval on 20 December 2006.
The merger was completed on 4 April 2007, forming NYSE Euronext.

The new firm, NYSE Euronext, was headquartered in New York City, with European operations and its trading platform run out of Paris. Then-NYSE CEO John Thain, who was to head NYSE Euronext, intended to use the combination to form the world's first global stock market, with continuous trading of stocks and derivatives over a 21-hour time span.  In addition, the two exchanges hoped to add Borsa Italiana (the Milan stock exchange) into the grouping.

In 2008 and 2009 Deutsche Börse made two unsuccessful attempts to merge with NYSE Euronext. Both attempts did not enter into advanced steps of merger. In 2011, Deutsche Börse and NYSE Euronext confirmed that they were in advanced merger talks. Such a merger would create the largest exchange in history. The deal was approved by shareholders of NYSE Euronext on 7 July 2011, and Deutsche Börse on 15 July 2011 and won the antitrust approved by the US regulators on 22 December 2011. On 1 February 2012, the deal was blocked by European Commission on the grounds that the new company would have resulted in a quasi-monopoly in the area of European financial derivatives traded globally on exchanges. Deutsche Börse unsuccessfully appealed this decision.

In 2012, Euronext announced the creation of Euronext London to offer listing facilities in the UK. As such, Euronext received in June 2014 Recognized Investment Exchange (RIE) status from Britain's Financial Conduct Authority.

On 20 December 2012, the boards of directors of both Intercontinental Exchange (ICE) and the NYSE Euronext approved an $8 billion acquisition of NYSE Euronext. Under the terms shareholders of NYSE would receive either $33.12 in cash for each share or .2581 IntercontinentalExchange Inc. shares, or a combination of $11.27 in cash per share plus .1703 shares of stock. The acquisition is subject to regulator approval, though since the operations of ICE and NYSE have little in common—ICE is largely devoted to trading commodities, as opposed to NYSE's business of trading stocks and securities—the deal is not expected to be blocked. ICE said that after the deal closed it would sell the Euronext portion of the company, including stock exchanges in Amsterdam, Brussels, Lisbon and Paris.  The deal went through and Euronext is a sister division to NYSE and part of ICE. ICE CEO Jeffrey Sprecher would continue in that position at the combined company, while NYSE CEO Duncan Niederauer would serve as president.  The future of the New York Stock Exchange's historic trading floor under ICE has not been announced.  ICE closed the high profile and historic trading floors of its other earlier acquisitions, the International Petroleum Exchange and the New York Board of Trade in New York.

In December 2012 Intercontinental Exchange (ICE) announced plans to acquire NYSE Euronext, owner of Euronext, in an $8.2 billion takeover.

In May 2013, Euronext established Enternext as a subsidiary to help small and medium-size enterprises (SMEs) listed on Euronext outline and apply a strategy most suited to support their growth.

The ICE's deal was approved by the shareholders of NYSE Euronext and Intercontinental Exchange on 3 June 2013.
The European Commission approved the acquisition on 24 June 2013
 
and on 15 August 2013 the US regulator, SEC, granted approval of the acquisition.
European regulators and ministries of Finance of the participating countries approved the deal and on 13 November 2013 the acquisition was completed.

2014–present: Spin-off from ICE and subsequent development

Part of ICE's deal to acquire NYSE Euronext was a spin-off for Euronext, which was considered a positive element for European stakeholders. After a complex series of operations, this occurred on 20 June 2014, through an initial public offering (IPO). The former Euronext.LIFFE was retained by ICE and renamed ICE Futures Europe. In order to stabilise Euronext, a consortium of eleven investors decided to invest in the company as "reference shareholders". These investors owned 33.36% of Euronext's capital and have a 3 years lockup period: Euroclear, BNP Paribas, BNP Paribas Fortis, Société Générale, Caisse des Dépôts, BPI France, ABN Amro, ASR, Banco Espirito Santo, Banco BPI and Belgian holding public company  (SFPI/FPIM). They have 3 board seats.

In June 2014, EnterNext launched two initiatives to boost SME equity research and support the technology sector. EnterNext partnered with Morningstar to increase equity research focusing on mid-size companies, especially in the telecommunications, media and technology (TMT) sector.

On 22 September 2014, Euronext announced a partnership with DEGIRO regarding the distribution of retail services of Euronext. Upon publishing the third quarter results for 2014, the partnership was seen as a plan for Euronext to compete more effectively on the Dutch retail segment.

In May 2017, Alternext was renamed to Euronext Growth.

On 14 August 2017, Euronext announced the completion of its acquisition of FastMatch, a currency trading platform.

On 27 March 2018, Euronext announced the completion of its acquisition of the Irish Stock Exchange.

On 18 June 2019, Euronext announced the completion of its acquisition of the Oslo Stock Exchange.

On 5 December 2019, Euronext announced that it would acquire 66% of the European power exchange Nord Pool. The acquisition was completed on 15 January 2020.

On 23 April 2020, Euronext announced that it would acquire ca. 70% of the Danish Central Securities Depository, VP Securities. The acquisition was completed on 4 August 2020.

On 18 September 2020, the London Stock Exchange Group (LSEG) entered into exclusive talks to sell the Italian Bourse (formally 100% of London Stock Exchange Group Holdings Italia S.p.A.), situated in Milan, to Euronext. As part of the deal, CDP Equity, 100% owned by Cassa Depositi e Prestiti, and Intesa Sanpaolo would become Euronext shareholders. LSEG is selling Italian Bourse as part of regulatory remedies to see through its $27 billion purchase of data provider Refinitiv. A €4.3 bn deal was announced on 9 October, albeit contingent on the European Commission formally stating in mid-December that it will only permit LSEG's acquisition of Refinitiv if the Italian Bourse is sold. 
On 29 April 2021, Euronext closed a deal to purchase Borsa Italiana from London Stock Exchange Group (LSEG) to acquire Borsa Italiana Group. On  29 April 2021, Euronext announced the completion of its acquisition of the Italian Bourse.

See also 
 Bourse of Antwerp, the world's first financial exchange
 Economy of the European Union
 Euroclear
 List of European stock exchanges
 List of stock exchanges

References

External links

 
 

 
 
Financial services companies established in 2000
2007 mergers and acquisitions
Corporate spin-offs